Beli may refer to:

People
 Beli ap Rhun (c. 580–c. 599), king of Gwynedd
 Beli I of Alt Clut (perhaps died c. 627), Brittonic king
 Beli II of Alt Clut (died c. died 722), Brittonic king
 Ljubiša Preletačević Beli (born 1991), Serbian political activist and satirical presidential candidate

Mythology
 Beli (jötunn), a jötunn killed by Freyr in Norse mythology
 Beli Mawr, a Welsh ancestor deity
 Beli (or Bele), king of Sogn, from the Norse myth Frithiof's Saga
 Beli Naloca, son of the mr. Carlos Naloca from Mozambique, born in Quelimane

Other uses
 Aegle marmelos or bael, a fruit-bearing plant common in South and South East Asia
 Beli, Croatia, a town on the Croatian island of Cres, named Caisole in Italian
 Beli, Kočani, a village in Kočani Municipality, Republic of North Macedonia
 Beli, Lucknow, a village in Uttar Pradesh, India
 Beli language, a Torricelli language of Papua New Guinea
 Beli language (South Sudan)
 Beli (moon), a moon of Saturn
 Jur Beli people, a people of Southern Sudan

See also
 Beli Breg (disambiguation)
 Beli Kamen (disambiguation)
 Beli Potok (disambiguation)
 Beli Naloca (Mozambican)
 Belli (disambiguation)
 Bely (disambiguation)